Salta Basin or Salta Rift Basin is a sedimentary basin located in the Argentine Northwest. The basin contains seven sub-basins: Tres Cruces, Lomas de Olmedo, Metán, Alemanía, Salfity, El Rey, Sey and Brealito. The basin environment has variously been described as a "foreland rift" and an "intra-continental rift". The basin developed under conditions of extensional tectonics and rift-associated volcanism.

Description 
The basin basement is composed of rocks belonging to the Puncoviscana Formation. The volcanism that began in the Late Jurassic was initially of subalkaline character (low sodium and potassium content), but turned increasingly alkaline in the Early Cretaceous.

The rifts of Salta Basin developed in a time of generalized extensional tectonics along western South America. It has been proposed that the Salar de Atacama depression in Chile was once a westward rift arm of the Salta Basin.

Stratigraphy

References

Bibliography 

General
 
  
 
   
 
   

Guanaco Sonso Formation
 

Lumbrera Formation
 
 
 

Maíz Gordo Formation
 

Mealla Formation
 

Palo Pintado Formation
 
 
 

Piquete Formation
 

Quebrada de Los Colorados Formation

Further reading 
  

 
Foreland basins
Mesozoic rifts and grabens
Sedimentary basins of Argentina
Sedimentary basins of Bolivia
Sedimentary basins of Chile
Geology of Antofagasta Region
Geology of Jujuy Province
Geography of Potosí Department
Geology of Salta Province
Geology of Tucumán Province